Little Tibet may refer to:

 Ladakh, a union territory in Northern India
 Baltistan, a region in Northern Pakistan
 Little Tibet, Toronto, an ethnic enclave in the Parkdale area of Toronto, Ontario, Canada known for a large number of Tibetan emigres